The Worcester Masonic Temple is a historic Masonic temple Located at 1 Ionic Avenue in downtown Worcester, Massachusetts. Construction on the temple began on September 12, 1913, with the laying of the cornerstone. The building was finished and dedicated on September 3, 1914, by the then Grand Master, Most Worshipful Melvin M. Johnson.

The building is an excellent instance of a Classical Revival building.  The three story building's main facade is defined by eight Ionic columns (which supposedly gave Ionic Avenue its name), four on each side of central entry that is topped by a stone pedimented entablature.  The spaces between the other columns are filled by windows topped by rounded arches.  The interior of the building features a drill hall and banquet hall on the ground floor, a "Grecian" chamber on the second level, and an "Egyptian" chamber on the third, as well as housing a Gothic chapel.

The temple was added to the National Register of Historic Places in 1980.  It continues to be used by Masonic lodges.

Organizations
Morning Star Lodge A.F & A.M., founded in 1793

Other organizations using the facilities: 
 The Worcester Chapter of Demolay 
 The Worcester 32nd Degree Masonic Learning Center for Dyslexia
 The Scottish Rite Valley of Worcester, Northern Masonic Jurisdiction
 The York Rite Bodies of Worcester
 Thistle Lodge #2 of the Daughters of Scotia

See also
National Register of Historic Places listings in southwestern Worcester, Massachusetts
National Register of Historic Places listings in Worcester County, Massachusetts

References

Clubhouses on the National Register of Historic Places in Massachusetts
Neoclassical architecture in Massachusetts
Masonic buildings completed in 1914
Buildings and structures in Worcester, Massachusetts
Masonic buildings in Massachusetts
National Register of Historic Places in Worcester, Massachusetts